Hans Homma (1874–1943) was an Austrian stage and film actor. He also directed a number of silent films.

Homma was known for his work at Vienna's Burgtheater.

Filmography

Actor
 Queen Draga (1920) - Dr. White
 The Hands of Orlac (1924) - Dr. Serral
 The Woman of Yesterday and Tomorrow (1928)
 Modellhaus Crevette (1928)
 Archduke John (1929) - Fürst Metternich, Staatskanzler
 Die Dame auf der Banknote (1929)
 The Monte Cristo of Prague (1929) - Examining Judge
 Spring Parade (1934) - Ein Hofrat (uncredited)
 Leap into Bliss (1934) - Braun - Geschäftsführer
 The Secret of Cavelli (1934) - General von Ketterer
 Bretter, die die Welt bedeuten (1935) - Herr Rainer, Pauls Vater
 Last Love (1935) - Direktor der Wiener Oper
 Her Highness Dances the Waltz (1935) - Fürst Franz von Hohenau
 Unsterbliche Melodien (1936) - Director vom Theater an der Wien
 Flowers from Nice (1936) - Francois (final film role)

Director
 The Venus (1922)
 The Ghost of Morton's Castle (1922)
 The Marquise of Clermont (1922)
 The Hell of Barballo (1923)

References

Bibliography
 Ryan Shand, Small-Gauge Storytelling: Discovering the Amateur Fiction Film: Discovering the Amateur Fiction Film. Edinburgh University Press, 2013.

External links

1874 births
1943 deaths
Austrian male stage actors
Austrian male film actors
Austrian film directors
Male actors from Vienna